Fabian Hugh Poulin (9 February 1931 – 12 October 2018) was a lawyer, judge, and former Liberal party member of the House of Commons of Canada.

He was first elected at the Ottawa Centre riding in the 1972 general election, then re-elected there in the 1974 election. Poulin left federal politics on 27 April 1978 before completing his term in the 30th Canadian Parliament to become a judge of the Ontario Superior Court of Justice.  Poulin had three daughters: Diana, Elizabeth, and Carole and two sons: Fabian and John.

References

External links
 

1931 births
2018 deaths
Judges in Ontario
Lawyers in Ontario
Liberal Party of Canada MPs
Members of the House of Commons of Canada from Ontario
Politicians from Ottawa